Portunus sanguinolentus, the three-spot swimming crab , blood-spotted swimming crab or red-spotted swimming crab, is a large crab found throughout estuaries of the Indian and West Pacific Oceanic countries.

Distribution
A cosmopolitan species widely distributed all major water of the world, found through Red Sea, Persian Gulf, Mozambique, South Africa, Madagascar, Mauritius, Pakistan, India, Maldives, Sri Lanka, Andaman Islands, Myanmar, Malay Peninsula, Thailand, Japan, Korea, Taiwan, China, Singapore, Indonesia, Philippines, Java, Australia, and Hawaii.

Subspecies
Two subspecies are recognized:
Portunus (Portunus) sanguinolentus hawaiiensis Stephenson, 1968
Portunus (Portunus) sanguinolentus sanguinolentus (Herbst, 1783)

Description
A large crab with 15–20 cm of maximum length. Greyish green carapace is very broad and characterized by 3 red spots in posterior half. A strong spine can be seen on each side. Swimming legs are flattened and claws are long.

Ecology
Primarily a carnivore, found in marine waters and intertidal zone by juveniles. Inhabits sandy to muddy substrates. It is a harmless crab, but being pinched by its claws can be painful.

Commercially harvested as an edible crab species in many countries.

References

Portunoidea
Crustaceans described in 1783
Cosmopolitan arthropods